Laloor is a residential area situated in the city of Thrissur in Kerala, India. It is Ward 50 of Thrissur Municipal Corporation as of 2020.

Places of Interest

Laloor Bhagavathy Temple
Dr. John Matthai Centre(School of Drama)
IM Vijayan Indoor Stadium
Holy Trinity Ashram
St. Aloysius College, Thrissur

See also
Laloorinu Parayanullathu
Thrissur
Thrissur District

References

Suburbs of Thrissur city